Aleksandr Perfilyev (1895, Chita, Transbaikal Oblast – 1973) was a Russian journalist, poet and writer.

References

1895 births
1973 deaths
People from Chita, Zabaykalsky Krai
People from Transbaikal Oblast
Russian military personnel
Russian male poets
20th-century Russian poets
20th-century Russian male writers
20th-century Russian journalists